Affieux is a commune in the Corrèze department in the Nouvelle-Aquitaine region of central France.

The inhabitants of the commune are known as Affieucois or Affieucoises.

The commune has been awarded two flowers by the National Council of Towns and Villages in Bloom in the Competition of cities and villages in Bloom.

Geography

Affieux is located some 45 km south-east of Limoges (in a straight line). Access to the commune is by road D940 from Treignac in the north passing south through the east of the commune to Le Lonzac. The D20 road also comes from Treignac, changing to the D3E3 in the commune and passing through the village before continuing south-west to join the D3 south-west of the commune.

The Vézère river forms the western and northern border of the commune with numerous streams criss-crossing the commune and flowing to this river. There is also a lake to the south of the town of Affieux.

Localities and villages
Affieux
Les Rivieres
La Louche
La Gane
Le Fargeau
Espinet
Le Peuch
Marcilloux
Merciel

Neighbouring Communes and Villages

Heraldry

Administration

List of Successive Mayors of Affieux

Population

Culture and heritage

Civil heritage
The commune has a number of buildings and structures that are registered as historical monuments:
A Chateau at le Peuch (16th century)
The Chateau de Maury (19th century)
A Chateau at Balème (17th century)
A Farmhouse at l'Allouche (1605)
A Chateau (1636)
Farmhouses (17th-20th centuries)

Religious heritage
The commune has several religious buildings and structures that are registered as historical monuments:
The Chapel of Notre-Dame-de-Lourdes (1874)
A Cemetery Cross (19th century)
A Monumental Cross (18th century)
Monumental Crosses (17th-20th centuries)
The Parish Church of Saint-Pardoux (1772)

The Parish Church contains many items that are registered as historical objects:

An Altar tombstone, 2 altar seatings, the Altar, a winged Tabernacle, and exhibition dais (17th century)
A sun-shaped Monstrance (1819)
A Tombstone
A Flowered Vase (19th century)
A Flowered Vase (19th century)
A sun-shaped Monstrance (1819)
A Ciborium for the sick (19th century)
A Ciborium (1838)
A Paten (1838)
A Chalice with Paten (19th century)
A Chalice (1838)
A Statuette: Immaculate conception (18th century)
2 Statues: Kneeling angels worshipping (17th century)
2 Statues: Standing angels worshipping (17th century)
A Tabernacle (18th century)
Altar seating, Tabernacle and exhibition (18th century)
Altar tomb (18th century)
Secondary Altar: Altar, seating, and Tabernacle (18th century)
A Tabernacle Urn (1768)
2 Statues: Saint Gilles and Saint Pardoux (1768)
An Altar Painting: The Assumption (1768)
The Retable architecture (1768)
A Baptismal font (13th century)
A Stoup (19th century)

Notable People linked to the Commune
 Jean Alambre: a writer and composer in French and Occitan
 Élise Palaudoux (called Nataska): (1895-1985), a designer. Her designs were shown at the Museum of Art Brut or Outsider Art in Lausanne. A street in the commune of Cabestany (Pyrénées-Orientales), bears the name "Nataska".

See also 
 Communes of the Corrèze department

References

External links
Affieux on the old IGN website 
Affieux on the 1750 Cassini Map

Communes of Corrèze